Patrice Lovely (born January 4, 1968) is an American actress. She is best known for her role as Hattie Mae Love in the sitcom Love Thy Neighbor and the comedy films Boo! A Madea Halloween, Boo 2! A Madea Halloween, and A Madea Family Funeral, the latter of which was released on March 1, 2019.

Career
Lovely started acting in 1997. In 2004, she joined the UniverSoul Circus as a ringmaster alongside Shuckey Duckey as Ms. Mabelle. In 2009, she played "Auntie" at the UniverSoul circus. She returned to the Big Top in 2010 as Grandma Maggie with Daniel "Lucky" Malatsi playing her grandson. In 2011, Lovely debuted on the stage for A Madea's Christmas, then she has been in other shows such as fan favorite I Don't Want to Do Wrong. In 2013, she joined the cast of the new sitcom Love Thy Neighbor. Lovely has recorded two gospel albums, Glory Road and Seven Days.

Filmography

References

External links
 

Living people
American television actresses
1968 births
Comedians from Mississippi
21st-century American actresses
Actresses from Mississippi
African-American actresses
Actors from Jackson, Mississippi
21st-century African-American women
21st-century African-American people
20th-century African-American people
20th-century African-American women